Stephen Samuel Stratton (19 December 1840 – 25 June 1906) was an English music critic, organist and author.

Life
He was born in London on 19 December 1840. He was a chorister at St. Mary's Church, Ealing and studied music under Charles Lucas.

He arrived in Birmingham in 1866 and became music critic to the Birmingham Post in 1877, holding the post until his death. He was also a frequent contributor to the London Musical Press. He was the joint author with James Duff Brown of British Musical Biography published in 1897.

Appointments
 Organist of St. Mary the Virgin, Soho, London
 Organist of St. James' Church, Friern Barnet
 Organist of St Bartholomew's Church, Edgbaston, Birmingham 1867 - 1875
 Organist of St. John's Church, Harborne 1875 - 1878
 Organist of the Church of the Saviour, Birmingham 1878 - 1882

Publications
 
 British Musical Biography, with James Duff Brown
 The Life of Mendelssohn 
 Nicolo Paganini: His Life and Work

References

External links
 
 

1840 births
1906 deaths
English organists
British male organists
English composers
19th-century English musicians
19th-century British male musicians
19th-century organists